Jeffrey is an unincorporated community and coal town in Boone County, West Virginia, United States. Jeffrey has a post office with ZIP code 25114. Jeffrey  Is located along the Spruce/Laurel River.

References

Unincorporated communities in Boone County, West Virginia
Unincorporated communities in West Virginia
Coal towns in West Virginia